Wayne Black and Kevin Ullyett were the defending champions but lost in the first round to Alberto Martín and Mariano Zabaleta.

Jeff Coetzee and Chris Haggard won in the final 2–6, 6–4, 7–6(9–7) against Arnaud Clément and Michaël Llodra.

Seeds

  Bob Bryan /  Mike Bryan (quarterfinals)
  Donald Johnson /  Jared Palmer (quarterfinals)
  Wayne Black /  Kevin Ullyett (first round)
  Joshua Eagle /  Andrew Kratzmann (quarterfinals)

Draw

External links
 2003 AAPT Championships Doubles Draw

Next Generation Adelaide International
2003 ATP Tour
2003 in Australian tennis